Wojciech Zubowski (born 12 November 1979) is a Polish politician. He has been a member of the Sejm since 2011 representing the constituency of Legnica. He was re-elected in 2015. In 2019, he was again elected to the Sejm (9th term). He is affiliated with the Law and Justice party.

He was born in Wrocław, Poland.

References 

Living people
1979 births
Politicians from Wrocław
21st-century Polish politicians
Members of the Polish Sejm 2011–2015
Members of the Polish Sejm 2015–2019
Members of the Polish Sejm 2019–2023
Law and Justice politicians